Michael Clark (May 12, 1861 – July 29, 1926) was a Canadian physician and politician from Alberta, Canada.

Early life
Born in Belford, Northumberland, England, he immigrated to Olds, Alberta, Canada in 1902. He was a physician in England prior to immigrating to Alberta, Canada. He became involved in politics after homesteading, because he was not able to practise medicine in Canada.

Political career
Clark ran as a Liberal candidate in the Rosebud electoral district in Alberta's first provincial election after it was admitted into Confederation, in 1905. He lost to Conservative candidate Cornelius Hiebert.

Clark ran for a seat to the House of Commons of Canada in the 1908 Canadian federal election, the first one to elect MPs from Alberta, in the Red Deer district as a candidate of the Liberal Party. He defeated Conservative candidate George Root to win in the new riding, to start his first term in office. Clark ran for his second term in office in the 1911 Canadian federal election; this time, he defeated Conservative challenger and future Member of the Legislative Assembly (MLA) Alexander McGillivray.

Clark joined the board of directors for the University of Alberta in 1911 and served in that position for a year.

In 1917, he ran for his third term in office as a supporter of the Unionist government and was successful, defeating former Alberta MLA William Puffer. Clark joined the Progressive Party of Canada in 1920 but returned to the Liberals just a year later due to his opposition to class-based politics practised by the United Farmers of Alberta.

He ran for the Liberals in the Mackenzie electoral district in Saskatchewan in the 1921 Canadian federal election but was defeated by Progressive candidate Milton Neil Campbell and lost his seat.

References

External links
 
 

1861 births
1926 deaths
Members of the House of Commons of Canada from Alberta
Liberal Party of Canada MPs
Unionist Party (Canada) MPs
Progressive Party of Canada MPs
People from Olds, Alberta
People from Belford, Northumberland